Peter Pysall (born 26 June 1960) is a German former handball player. He competed in the men's tournament at the 1988 Summer Olympics.

References

External links
 

1960 births
Living people
German male handball players
Olympic handball players of East Germany
Handball players at the 1988 Summer Olympics
People from Heilbad Heiligenstadt
Sportspeople from Thuringia
SC Magdeburg players